Baanam is a 2009 Indian Telugu-language action drama film directed by the debutant Chaitanya Dantuluri, starring Nara Rohit and Vedhika in the lead roles. Produced by Priyanka Dutt under the banner Three Angels Studio Pvt Ltd, the film also marks Nara Rohith's debut as lead actor.

Baanam was released theatrically on 16 September 2009. The film was moderate box office success but received positive reviews from critics. It was also dubbed in Hindi-language under the title Jeo Aur Jeeno Do.

Plot 
The story is set in the town of Ranasthali, in the year 1989. Bhagat Panigrahi is preparing to become an IPS officer. His father, Chandrasekhar Panigrahi, a former Naxalite, returns after 20 years before giving up his fight for the society because of his retirement. According to his ideology, at a certain time, every person wants to retire in their works. He became the first person who retired in naxalism. He comes back home and questions his son's ambition of becoming an IPS because his wife was killed by a policeman. Bhagath convinces him with his point of logic and gets the acceptance from his father. Meanwhile, a local don, Shakti Patnaik, is slowly building his empire, terrorizing police and anyone who opposes him.

One day, Bhagat meets Subbalaxmi, a naive married Brahmin girl at a railway station; she was abandoned by her in-laws because of insufficient dowry. Unable to pay the dowry, her father commits suicide unknown to her. Then with the help of Bhagath, she starts a new life to become an independent women. One day her husband sends a message to her for a secret meeting, then Bhagath came with her to meet him; in that meeting, she ends her relationship with her husband. Then on the urge of taking revenge on her, her ex-husband involves Shakti's gang to abduct her, which triggers a series of events between Bhagat and Shakti. After that, Bhagath proposes to Subbalakshmi for marriage she eventually accepts. Meanwhile, Bhagath manages to qualify in UPSC and is selected for training in the middle of the route. Shakti and his gang interrupts him and severely injured him. Then angered Sr.panigrahi tries to kill Shakti, but the attempt was missed and caught by Shakti, then he kills him brutally. After knowing the facts, Bhagath decides to destroy Shakti. He meets a senior IPS officer once who inspired Bhagath to become an IPS Officer in his childhood by asking trainees to stand up for the fight against the tyranny of Shakti. Earlier, he refuses, and later, he accepts. Then all the gang attacks the gang members of Shakti and his businesses with solid evidence. Then Shakti tries to run away to Hyderabad. Bhagath and his gang came to arrest Shakti along with the police then Bhagath catches Shakti, and a fight ensues between them in the fight, Bhagath kills Shakti.

After that, the trainees got their postings, and Bhagath is ready to go for his training in the police academy. The film ends with the line "a new chapter begins".

Cast

Soundtrack

The music for the film has been composed by Mani Sharma. The audio was launched on 24 August 2009, and also present during the event were Shyam Prasad Reddy, industrialist Vasu. This was done with variety as five channels were taken for the coverage and biggies like N. Chandrababu Naidu, Dasari Narayana Rao, Nandamuri Balakrishna, Allu Aravind, Jr. NTR unveiled the audio CD and released one song each in each channel.

Release
 The film was released on 16 September 2009.

Box-office and critical reception
 The film was a moderate success at Box-office
 The film got rave reviews from the critics for Chaitanya's work in dealing with the socially sensitive and long-lasting stand that's going on between Police and Naxalism. Lead actors Nara Rohit and Vedhika were appreciated by critics. Idlebrain.com review said - Nara Rohit delivers what is needed for the character. Vedhika did the role of a traditional Brahmin girl and she is apt.
 The film won Nandi  Award for Second Best Feature Film won by Seshu Priyanka Chalasani (2009)
 Nomination for Chaitanya Dantuluri, Filmfare Best Director Award (Telugu).

References

External links 
 

2009 films
2000s Telugu-language films
2009 action drama films
Indian action drama films
Indian police films
Films set in 1989
Films scored by Mani Sharma
Fictional portrayals of the Andhra Pradesh Police
Fictional portrayals of the Telangana Police
2009 directorial debut films